is a Japanese deity (kami) who appears in Japanese mythology. Ame-no-tajikarao is written as 天手力男神 in Kojiki, and 天手力雄神 in Nihon Shoki. Tajikarao's name means heaven hand power.

Another name is Oosugutama-no-mikoto or Takuzutama-no-mikoto (多久豆魂命), as Ama-no-Iwatowake-no-kami (天石門別神) other names is Ookuzutama-no-mikoto (大国栖玉命) and Tachikarao-mikoto (大刀辛雄命).

Mythological description 
At the event of Amano-Iwato (天岩戸, literally "heavenly rock cave"), Ame-no-tajikarao waited at the caves' door to pull out (in the Nihon Shoki and the Kogo Shūi, 'to pull open') Amaterasu (天照) from the cave, and thus return light to the world.

During the Tenson kōrin, Amaterasu had Omoikane, Ame-no-tajikarao, and Ama-no-iwato-wake-no-kami accompany the Imperial Regalia of Japan when it went to the Ise province to be enshrined at Ise Grand Shrine.

In the genealogy of Mochizuki (望月氏) clan, he is the grandson of deity Kamimusubi (神産巣日) and the ancestor of a clan of the ancient kingdom of Ki-no-kuni-miyatsuko (紀国造), which is modern-day Wakayama Prefecture, which in the Shinsen Shōjiroku (新撰姓氏録, "New Selection and Record of Hereditary Titles and Family Names").

However, in another genealogical text, Ame-no-Tajikarao appears to be the child of Ame-Yagokoro-Omoikane-no-mikoto (天八意思兼命 - another name of the deity Omoikane (思兼 or 思金), which is the honored distant ancestor of the Achinohōri clan. Although in relation to this clan, inscribed in another text, the child of the deity Omoikane, Ame-no-Uwaharu-no-mikoto (天表春命), the name of Ame-no-Tajikarao is nowhere to be seen in the genealogy tree. 

His own Shinto priests think he was originally a protector of agriculture (maybe because he brought back sun light to the world, or maybe because peasants need fitness to work in the fields). Strangely, this god is often in association with Sugawara no Michizane, as the god Tenjin.

Explanation 
The name Ame-no-tajikarao carries the connotation of a male god with extreme and surmounting physical brute strength.

Shrines 
Ame-no-tajikaro is believed to be a god of sports and physical power, and is enshrined at shrines associated:

 Ise Grand Shrine (伊勢神宮) -  Ise, Mie Prefecture
 Togakushi Shrine (戸隠神社) - Nagano city, Nagano Prefecture
 Sana Shrine (佐那神社) - Taki District, Mie Prefecture
 Iwatowake Shrine (伊波止和気神社) - Ishikawa District, Fukushima Prefecture
 Haseyamaguchisuwa Shrine (長谷山口坐神社) - Sakurai (city), Nara Prefecture
 Shirai Shrine (白井神社) - Amagasaki, Hyōgo Prefecture
 Oyama Shrine (雄山神社) - Nakaniikawa District, Toyama Prefecture
 Tejikarao Shrine (手力雄神社) - Gifu (city), Gifu Prefecture
 Tejikarao Shrine (手力雄神社) - Kakamigahara, Gifu Prefecture
 Ōmatsuri-ame-no-iwatohiko Shrine (大祭天石門彦神社) - Hamada (city), Shimane Prefecture
 Ama-no-iwatowake Yasukutama-nushi-amatsukami Shrine (天石門別安國玉主天神社) - Takaoka District, Kōchi Prefecture
 Toake Shrine (戸明神社) - Kitakyushu (city), Fukuoka Prefecture
 Ame-no-ta-nagao Shrine (天手長男神社) - Iki, Nagasaki Prefecture
 Takuzudama Shrine (多久頭魂神社) - Tsushima (city), Nagasaki Prefecture

At the Togakushi Shrine there's a legend that says that the cave door that Ame-no-tajikarao threw away landed on Togakushi mountain (戸隠山) in Shinano Province (信濃国).

References 

 This article was translated from its Japanese Wikipedia equivalent article at アメノタジカラオ.

External links
Amenotajikarao - History of Japan Database

Japanese gods
Shinto
Japanese mythology
Amatsukami